Seacret (Seacret Spa International/Seacret Direct) is a United States-based multi-level marketing company that sells cosmetic and other personal care products made from Dead Sea minerals, mud, and nutrients. The company was founded by Izhak and Moty Ben Shabat in 2005.

History 
In 2001, brothers Izhak and Moty Ben Shabat began selling Israeli Dead Sea products out of kiosks in shopping malls. They founded Seacret Spa International as a skin care retail business in 2005. Since then, Izhak has served as company president and CEO, while Moty has served as managing partner. The company claimed to have had retailers in 30 countries and revenue of US$100 million in 2010.

In 2011, the brothers spun off Seacret Direct, a multi-level marketing branch that sells Seacret products through a network of independent distributors, referred to as 'Seacret Agents'. Seacret Direct launched sales in Canada and Australia in 2013, followed by South Korea and Mexico in 2014, Japan in 2015, and Colombia in 2019. Seacret reported unaudited revenue of $12 million in 2012, $71 million in 2013, and $211.5 million in 2018.

Mall kiosks featuring Seacret products in the U.S. and Canada have been the subject of controversy regarding illegal immigration schemes and overly aggressive sales tactics.

In November 2020, Seacret announced its merger with WorldVentures.

References 

Multi-level marketing companies
Retail companies established in 2005
American companies established in 2005
Companies based in Phoenix, Arizona
2005 establishments in Arizona